Teng-Hui Huang (a.k.a. Robert Huang)  was born on December 5, 1959. He is a Taiwanese artist and entrepreneur. He graduated from Tunghai University, and also holds a master's degree, and Ph.D candidacy from Tsing Hua University in Beijing.
From 1985 to 1990, Robert Huang was one of the cofounders of the Utopia, the earliest communal complex rebuild project in Taichung. The project transformed an obsolete complex into one that is aesthetically pleasing.

Because Huang was very interested in the classic book The Little Prince, by Antoine de Saint-Exupery, he founded Rose House, a rose-themed afternoon tea store in 1990. Huang's early paintings are predominantly about Roses, and thus he is named the "Rose" artist, but he gradually shifted toward abstraction in 2010.

In 2003, his artwork was approved by the Visa cover commission board, and he became the first Chinese artist whose artwork is shown on the cover of a Visa credit card. He then had several paintings covers on Mastercard and JCB cards.

Huang is also a porcelain designer. He was commissioned by Aynsley to design the 2010 Prince William and Kate Middleton commemorative wedding collection and the Queen's coronation collection.

Art work

References

External links
Taiwanese artist creates vases for Queen's coronation anniversary
A rose by a Chinese name: Robert Huang honored by Royal Rose Society
At Rose House, a rose is never just a rose
Roses inspired Huang's founding of Rose House
Rose House-- Taiwan Takes its Tea in British Style
Rose House branches

1959 births
Living people
Taiwanese artists